Bambey is a town of commune status located in the Diourbel Region of Senegal

Transport 
The town lies on the N3 road connecting it to Dakar and is also served by a mainline station on the Dakar-Niger Railway.

References 

Populated places in Diourbel Region
Communes of Senegal